Kašku ("shining star") was the Hattian Moon god. The angry weather god Taru drenched him with a shower of rain and buffetted him with wind, which the goddess  noticed while looking down from heaven, whereupon she and Ḫapantali carried out a ritual to calm Taru. The myth belongs to a ritual which was to be carried out by the "Man of the weather god, if the weather god thunders terribly."

See also 

 Kušuḫ

Bibliography
 Heinrich Otten: "Kašku". In Dietz Otto Edzard (Ed.): Reallexikon der Assyriologie und Vorderasiatischen Archäologie. Volume 5, Walter de Gruyter, Berlin/New York 1976–1980, p. 464.

Hattian deities
Lunar gods